The Birkkarspitze (2749 m) is the highest mountain in the Karwendel range, Austria as well as an ultra prominent peak. It is located within the Innsbruck-Land District of Tyrol, Austria.

See also
List of Alpine peaks by prominence

References

External links

 "Birkkarspitze, Austria" on Peakbagger

Mountains of Tyrol (state)
Karwendel
Mountains of the Alps

pt:Montes de Karwendel